Ellery Queen and the Murder Ring is a 1941 American mystery film directed by James P. Hogan and written by Eric Taylor and Gertrude Purcell. It is based on the 1931 novel The Dutch Shoe Mystery by Ellery Queen. The film stars Ralph Bellamy, Margaret Lindsay, Charley Grapewin, Mona Barrie, Paul Hurst and James Burke, George Zucco and Blanche Yurka. The film was released on November 18, 1941, by Columbia Pictures.

Plot

Cast          
Ralph Bellamy as Ellery Queen
Margaret Lindsay as Nikki Porter
Charley Grapewin as Inspector Queen
Mona Barrie as Marian Tracy
Paul Hurst as Page
James Burke as Sergeant Velie
George Zucco as Dr. Edwin L. Jannery
Blanche Yurka as Mrs. Augusta Stack
Tom Dugan as Lou Thomas
Leon Ames as John Stack
Jean Fenwick as Alice Stack
Olin Howland as Dr. Williams 
Dennis Moore as Dr. Dunn
Charlotte Wynters as Miss Fox
Pierre Watkin as Crothers

References

External links
 

1941 films
1940s English-language films
American mystery films
1941 mystery films
Columbia Pictures films
Films directed by James Patrick Hogan
American black-and-white films
1940s American films
Ellery Queen films